Sadiq-ur-Rahman Kidwai is an Indian writer, academician and a former dean of the School of Languages, Jawaharlal Nehru University, known for his scholarship in Urdu literature. He is the secretary of the Ghalib Institute, renowned educational and cultural institution in Delhi and a member of the Goethe Society of India. He was honored by the Government of India, in 2010, with the fourth highest Indian civilian award of Padma Shri.

See also

 Mirza Ghalib
 Faiz Ahmed Faiz

References

Further reading

External links
 

Living people
Recipients of the Padma Shri in literature & education
Urdu-language writers from India
Writers from Delhi
Year of birth missing (living people)